
The Avia BH-2 was a single-seat sports plane built in Czechoslovakia in 1921. Originally intended to be powered by an Indian motorcycle engine, this was found to be unsuitable and a Bristol Cherub was fitted instead. It is uncertain today whether the aircraft ever actually flew in either configuration.

Specifications

References

 
 
 Němeček, V. (1968). Československá letadla. Praha: Naše Vojsko.

1920s Czechoslovakian sport aircraft
BH-02
Single-engined tractor aircraft